Asaf is a name. People with the name include:

Given name
alternate spelling of Saint Asaph (died 601), Welsh Roman Catholic saint and bishop
Asaf-ud-Daula, Nawab wazir of Awadh
Asaf Abdrakhmanov (1918–2000), Soviet sailor during World War II; award the title Hero of the Soviet Union
Assaf Amdursky (born 1971), Israeli singer, songwriter and music producer
Asaf Ali (1888–1953), Indian independence fighter and lawyer
Asaf Assi Dayan (born 1945), Israeli film director, actor, screenwriter and producer; son of Moshe Dayan
Asaf Avidan (born 1980), Israeli singer-songwriter and musician
Asaf Duraković (born 1940), Croatian physician and expert in nuclear medicine and depleted uranium
Asaf Hanuka (born 1974), Israeli illustrator and comic book artist, notable for his autobiographical comic The Realist
Assaf Hefetz (born 1944), commissioner of the Israeli Police
Asaf Humayun (born 1951), retired vice admiral of the Pakistan Navy
Asaf Khan (disambiguation), several Mughal noblemen
Asaf Messerer (1903–1992), Russian Jewish ballet dancer and teacher
Asaf Shariv (born 1972), Israel's Consul General in New York
Asaf Zeynally (1909–1932), Azerbaijani composer
Asaf Simhoni (1922–1956), Israeli Major General

Surname
George Asaf, pseudonym of George Henry Powell (1880–1951), Welsh songwriter best known for writing "Pack Up Your Troubles in Your Old Kit-Bag"

See also
Asif, a given name
Assaf (disambiguation)
Asafu
Asaf Jahi dynasty